Ersan Rovčanin (born 24 March 1993) is a Serbian football midfielder.

Club career
Born in Prijepolje, Rovčanin passed youth categories of Partizan. After his youth career, Rovčanin joined HNK Čapljina, where he was playing between 2012 and 2013. Later he was with NK Iskra Bugojno in 2014, and NK Jedinstvo Bihać from 2014 to 2015. For the 2015–16 season, Rovčanin joined Metalleghe-BSI. In summer 2016, he signed a three-year contract with Serbian SuperLiga side Metalac Gornji Milanovac.

References

External links
 

1993 births
Living people
People from Prijepolje
Association football midfielders
Serbian footballers
HNK Čapljina players
NK Iskra Bugojno players
NK Jedinstvo Bihać players
NK Metalleghe-BSI players
FK Metalac Gornji Milanovac players
FK TSC Bačka Topola players
Serbian SuperLiga players
Serbian First League players